Ndre (Dre) is a nearly extinct Yam language spoken in Western Province, Papua New Guinea. As of 2017, only one elderly speaker remained in the village of Ramar.

References

Nambu languages
Languages of Western Province (Papua New Guinea)